The Grand Prix at The Glen was an IndyCar Series race held at Watkins Glen International in Watkins Glen, New York. American open wheel racing at the circuit dates back to 1979.

Following a five-year hiatus, Watkins Glen was added back to the schedule for the 2016 season following the cancellation of the proposed Grand Prix of Boston. However, after the 2017 Season, it was announced that Portland International Raceway would be brought back to the 2018 IndyCar schedule, replacing the Watkins Glen event.

History

CART
The CART series held the first American open wheel racing events at the circuit from 1979–1981. It was held during the waning years of the Formula One United States Grand Prix. At the time the popular track was starting to lose some of its image, and by 1981, fell into bankruptcy. The Formula One race was cancelled for 1981, and for that year, the CART race took over its traditional October date.

For 1979 and 1980, the CART series utilized the  course layout, also known colloquially as the Six Hours course. In 1981, the "Boot" segment was utilized, and the Scheckter Chicane was removed, resulting in a  layout.

After 1981, the CART series left, and did not return. The track was continuing to suffer from financial difficulties and was falling into a state of disrepair. Eventually, the circuit was sold to ISC, and began to regain stature and popularity with the addition of NASCAR in 1986.

IndyCar Series 
The IRL IndyCar Series debuted at the track in 2005, the first season in which the IRL added road courses to the schedule. During its entire run, the IndyCar Series race utilized the full  circuit. The layout included the "Boot" and the "Inner Loop" bus stop chicane that was built in 1992.

In its first year, the race was scheduled for the traditional fall date. In 2006, however, it was moved to early June, the weekend immediately following the Indianapolis 500. It was paired alongside the traditional 6 Hours of Watkins Glen sports car event weekend. The move proved very unpopular, and was met with cool temperatures and rain. After only one season with the sports car and IndyCar doubleheader, for 2007, the IndyCar race was moved to Independence Day weekend.

The 2009 race, won by Justin Wilson, was the first IndyCar race ever won by Dale Coyne Racing, after 25 years of competition in the sport.

On June 28, 2007, Camping World signed a four-year deal to be the title sponsor of the race through 2010. Despite being considered a top venue by competitors, the race suffered from low attendance. Management believed that coupling the race with July 4 weekend was not ideal for attendance because many locals were out-of-town, and local college students were typically out of school for the summer and likewise also out-of-town. Furthermore, ISC, which owns Watkins Glen, pulled their events from the IndyCar calendar for 2011 after a dispute regarding sanctioning fees.

On May 13, 2016, following the cancellation of the proposed Grand Prix of Boston, the IndyCar Series announced that it would return to Watkins Glen, with the revived race being held on Labor Day weekend. Track management embraced the traditional fall date as the vacation season was over, and it enabled them to market to locals and college students whom were now back in town.

Past winners

2006: Race shortened due to two-hour time limit.

Support race history

References

http://www.indycar.com
http://www.champcarstats.com